The year 1504 in science and technology included a number of events, some of which are listed below.

Cartography
 probable date – Pedro Reinel's Atlantic chart is the earliest known nautical chart with a scale of latitudes, and with a wind rose having a clear fleur-de-lys.

Exploration
 February 29 – Christopher Columbus uses his knowledge of a lunar eclipse this night to convince Jamaican tribesmen to provide him with supplies.
 November 7 – Columbus returns to Spain from his fourth and last voyage, in which he and his younger son, Ferdinand, explored the coast of Central America from Belize to Panama.

Births
 Charles Estienne, French anatomist (died 1564)

Deaths
 June 19 – Bernhard Walther, German astronomer (born 1430).

 exact date unknown – Domenico Maria Novara da Ferrara (born 1454), Italian astronomer.

 
16th century in science
1500s in science